ADLS can refer to:

 Activities of daily living, a term used in healthcare about daily self-care activities
 Association of Dunkirk Little Ships, an association of owners of the Little Ships of Dunkirk
 Auckland District Law Society, a professional body in New Zealand
 Azure Data Lake Storage, a file system in Microsoft Azure

See also 
 ADL (disambiguation)